Johanna Konta and Maria Sanchez were the defending champions, but Konta chose to participate in Stuttgart instead. Sanchez partnered Anna Tatishvili, but they lost in the first round.

Asia Muhammad and Taylor Townsend won the title, defeating Caitlin Whoriskey and Keri Wong in an all-American final, 6–0, 6–1.

Seeds

Draw

References 
 Draw

Hardee's Pro Classic - Doubles
Hardee's Pro Classic